This is a list of episodes for the television series Thirtysomething.

Series overview

Episodes

Season 1 (1987–88)

Season 2 (1988–89)

Season 3 (1989–90)

Season 4 (1990–91)

References

thirtysomething episodes, List of